Alina Stanislavovna Sanko (born 31 December 1998) is a Russian model and beauty pageant titleholder who was crowned Miss Russia 2019. She represented Russia at Miss World 2019, where she placed in the top twelve, and also represented Russia at Miss Universe 2020, where she was unplaced.

Early life and education
Sanko was born on 31 December 1998 in Azov. Prior to winning Miss Russia 2019, Sanko resided in Moscow and studied architecture at the Moscow State University of Land Management. She had previously worked as a model for an online catalogue.

Pageantry 
In 2019, Sanko was selected to represent Azov at Miss Russia 2019. She went on to win the competition, succeeding Yulia Polyachikhina of Chuvashia. Her runners-up were Arina Verina of Yekaterinburg and Ralina Arabova of Tatarstan. As part of her winning prize, Sanko was awarded a brand new car and ₽3 million. 

As Miss Russia, Sanko was given the opportunity to represent Russia in both Miss World 2019 and Miss Universe 2019, however, due to conflicting dates she only competed in Miss World; Russia ultimately withdrew from Miss Universe following delays in announcing the date and venue of the competition, which would have made it difficult to find a replacement for Sanko to compete and secure that entrant an American visa. In March 2021, it was confirmed that Sanko would represent Russia at Miss Universe 2020.

References

1998 births
Living people
Miss Russia winners
Miss World 2019 delegates
People from Azov
Russian beauty pageant winners
Russian female models
Miss Universe 2020 contestants